James Jones (October 3, 1871 – February 19, 1955) was a Canadian sports shooter. He competed in the 1000 yard free rifle event at the 1908 Summer Olympics.

References

1871 births
1955 deaths
Canadian male sport shooters
Olympic shooters of Canada
Shooters at the 1908 Summer Olympics
Place of birth missing